Epanterias is a dubious genus of theropod dinosaur from the Kimmeridgian-Tithonian age Upper Jurassic upper Morrison Formation of Garden Park, Colorado. It was described by Edward Drinker Cope in 1878. The type species is Epanterias amplexus. This genus is based on what is now AMNH 5767, parts of three vertebrae, a coracoid, and a metatarsal. Although Cope thought it was a sauropod, it was later shown to be a theropod. Gregory S. Paul reassessed the material as pertaining to a large species of Allosaurus in 1988 (which he classified as Allosaurus amplexus). Other authors have gone further and considered E. amplexus as simply a large individual of Allosaurus fragilis. In 2010, Gregory S. Paul and Kenneth Carpenter noted that the E. amplexus specimen comes from higher in the Morrison Formation than the type specimen of Allosaurus fragilis, and is therefore "probably a different taxon". They also considered its holotype specimen not diagnostic and classified it as a nomen dubium.

Etymology
The generic epithet translates to "buttressed" in Greek, in reference to the vertebrae. The word amplexus refers to the copulatory position of Amphibians in which males clasp their mates. Therefore, the specific epithet means "clasping buttressed vertebrae" in Latin.

References

External links 
 Article about Epanterias and its taxonomic validity - web Dinosauria (in Czech)

Allosaurids
Late Jurassic dinosaurs of North America
Paleontology in Colorado
 
Nomina dubia
Fossil taxa described in 1878